Dudley den Dulk (born 24 June 1971) is a Curaçao sprinter who, with Bart Carpentier Alting, represented the Netherlands Antilles in the two man event at the 1992 Winter Olympics.

References

External links
 

1971 births
Living people
Curaçao male sprinters
Dutch Antillean male bobsledders
Olympic bobsledders of the Netherlands Antilles
Bobsledders at the 1992 Winter Olympics
Place of birth missing (living people)